Charles Earl Bartlett (1888-?) was an American silent film director.

Filmography

As actor
1912
 A Four-Footed Hero : Jack
 The Massacre of the Fourth Cavalry de Frank Montgomery : Lieutenant Davis
 The Half-Breed Scout de Frank Montgomery : Jim, un pionnier
 An Indian Ishmael : Lieutenant
 A Red Man's Love de Frank Montgomery : Caporal Taylor
 Trapper Bill, King of Scouts : Bill le Trappeur
 Star Eyes' Stratagem de Frank Montgomery : Crow Face, un guerrier Sioux
 The Tattoo : Cy Hardy
 At Old Fort Dearborn; or, Chicago in 1812 de Frank Montgomery : Dan Rawlins
 The Massacre of Santa Fe Trail de Frank Montgomery
 The Girl from Golden Run
 A Shot in the Dark de Ben F. Wilson : Tom Selvige
 For Love, Life and Riches de Frank Montgomery : Tom Warren
1913
 An Indian Maid's Strategy  de Frank Montgomery : Lieutenant Breen
 Against Desperate Odds de Frank Montgomery :Bob, le Shérif
 The Trail of the Lonesome Mine
 Beyond the Law : Bill, l'adjoint du shérif
 En permission de 24 heures (Soldiers Three) : Ned 
 The Grand Old Flag de Henry MacRae
 Love, Life and Liberty de Henry MacRae : Capitaine Mario
 In the Secret Service de Henry MacRae : Lieutenant Barrett
 One on Romance de Edwin Middleton
 The Song of the Telegraph de Frank Montgomery : Lieutenant Richards
 The Genius of Fort Lapawai : Bobby
 Regimental Pals
1914
 The Vanishing Tribe de Frank Montgomery : Deep Thunder
 The Moonshiners de Frank Montgomery : Bart, agent du fisc
 The Fuse of Death de Frank Montgomery : Lieutenant Countiss
 The Gambler's Reformation de Frank Montgomery : Weedon, un joueur
 The Cave of Death de Frank Montgomery : Deering, un prospecteur
 Kidnapped by Indians de Frank Montgomery : Capitaine Blake
 At the End of the Rope de Frank Montgomery : Manning, un colon
 Grey Eagle's Revenge de Frank Montgomery
 The Fate of a Squaw de Frank Montgomery : Larkin, un trappeur
 The Gypsy Gambler de Frank Montgomery : Romano, le père de Paulena
 Brought to Justice de Frank Montgomery : Shérif Tom Burden
 The Squaw's Revenge de Frank Montgomery : Dan, un colon
 The Call of the Tribe de Frank Montgomery : Dr Huff
 The Bottled Spider de Frank Montgomery : Rex, alias "The Spider" (l'araignée)
 The Redskins and the Renegades : Burns, de l'agence indienne
 Grey Eagle's Last Stand de Frank Montgomery : Tom Wells, le fils du Major
 The Fight on Deadwood Trail de Frank Montgomery : Griggs, un mineur
 The Raid of the Red Marauders : Hal Stevens, un soldat
 The Medicine Man's Vengeance : le "Medicine Man" blanc
 The Hopi Raiders : Capitaine Clark
 The Tigers of the Hills de Frank Montgomery : Lieutenant Howard
 An Indian's Honor de Frank Montgomery : Burns, un prospecteur
 Indian Fate de Frank Montgomery : Charles Bartells
 The Indian Ambuscade de Frank Montgomery : Jack, un jeune mineur
 The Paleface Brave de Frank Montgomery : Paul, le brave visage pâle
 Red Hawk's Sacrifice de Frank Montgomery : Binfield, un joueur
 Indian Blood de Frank Montgomery : Lieutenant Hayes
 A Dream of the Wild de Frank Montgomery : Tom
1915
 Pardoned de Tom Ricketts
 The Great Question de Tom Ricketts
 In Trust de B. Reeves Eason
 By Whose Hand? de Henry Otto
1916
 The Thunderbolt de William Bertram
1927
Don Desperado de Leo D. Maloney : Aaron Blaisdell

As director

 The Clean-Up
  Spider Barlow's Soft Spot
 The Water Carrier of San Juan
 Spider Barlow Cuts In
 The Key to the Past
 Drifting
  Alice of Hudson Bay
 On Secret Service
Out of the Ashes
 Visitors and Visitees
 The Sting of It
  Just as It Happened
1916
  The Girl Who Doesn't Know
  The Gold Band
  A Desperate Remedy
  The Small Magnetic Hand
  The Ancient Blood
  The Bruiser
  The Craving
 A Modern Sphinx
  The Silent Trail
  The Thoroughbred
  Spider Barlow Meets Competition
1917
 Jerry's Best Friend
  Jerry's Double Cross
  Jerry's Victory
  Hell Hath No Fury
1920
  Dangerous Love
1920
   Tangled Trails
  Headin' North

References

External links
 

American film directors
1888 births
Year of death missing
Articles containing video clips